"The Autumn Waltz" is a popular song with music by Cy Coleman and lyrics by Bob Hilliard, published in 1956.
The recording by Tony Bennett was released by Columbia Records as catalog number 40770. It first reached the Billboard magazine charts on November 17, 1956 and lasted 4 weeks on the chart. On the Disk Jockey chart, it peaked at #18; on the composite chart of the top 100 songs, it reached #41.

References

Songs with music by Cy Coleman
Songs with lyrics by Bob Hilliard
1956 songs
Tony Bennett songs
1956 singles
Columbia Records singles